Hilborough is a village and a civil parish in the English county of Norfolk.<ref>OS Explorer Map 236 - King’s Lynn, Downham Market & Swaffham. .</ref> The village is  south of Swaffham,  west-southwest of Norwich and  north-northeast of London.

The population of the parish (including Bodney) at the 2011 Census was 243. The village straddles the A1065 between Swaffham and Brandon. The nearest railway station is at Brandon for the Breckland Line which runs between Cambridge and Norwich.

History
Hilborough has an entry in the Domesday Book of 1086. In the great book Hilborough is recorded by the name Hildeburhwella''. The main landholder was William de Warenne. The main tenant was named as William. The survey also notes that there were three mills, and five beehives. The ancestors of Admiral Nelson, including the Admiral's father, the Reverend Edmund Nelson, who left for Burnham Thorpe shortly before Horatio was born, were rectors of the parish church of All Saints at Hilborough between 1734 and 1806.

In the 1990s the Hilborough Estate was bought by Hugh van Cutsem, who built a neo-Palladian mansion   designed by architect Francis Johnson. The efforts of the van Cutsem family and their estate workers resulted in the Hilborough Estate becoming one of the country's leading wild-bird shoots, winning awards for their conservation work.

Notable people
The family of Admiral Nelson. Nelson’s grandfather, father, uncle-by-marriage and his brother were all rectors of All Saints parish church in the village. As a young boy Nelson stayed with his uncle and grandmother in Hilborough. After the battle of the Nile, Nelson was created Baron Nelson of the Nile and Hilborough.

Other notable people 
 Sophia Cooke was born here in 1814. She was a school principal and missionary in Singapore.
 Chris Mead (1 May 1940 – 16 January 2003) was a British ornithologist, author and broadcaster, and an influential member of the British Trust for Ornithology (BTO).
 Hugh van Cutsem (21 July 1941 – 2 September 2013) was an English landowner, banker, businessman and horse-breeder.
 Fiona Richmond (born 2 March 1945) is a former glamour model and actress.
 Harriet Mead (born 2 September 1969) is a contemporary wildlife artist and President of the Society of Wildlife Artists.

References

 
Villages in Norfolk
Civil parishes in Norfolk
Breckland District